Terrance James Ball (born November 29, 1944) is a Canadian former professional ice hockey defenceman. Ball played in the National Hockey League, the World Hockey Association, the Finnish SM-Liiga, and several minor leagues in a career that spanned from 1964 until 1979.

Early life
Ball was born in Selkirk, Manitoba. He played junior with the Winnipeg Rangers and Brandon Wheat Kings, and Kitchener Rangers.

Career 
In 1963–64, Ball played eight games with the Vancouver Canucks of the Western Hockey League, but finished the season in junior. He played one further season in junior, with Kitchener and signed underage with the New York Rangers.

In 1964–65, Ball moved on to minor professional leagues, with the Minnesota Rangers. Ball remained in the New York Rangers farm system until 1967, when he was claimed in the expansion draft by Philadelphia. He played one game for the Flyers, but spent the rest of the season with their Quebec Aces affiliate. Ball played full-time in the NHL in 1969–70 with the Flyers, before being traded in the off-season to the Pittsburgh Penguins. Ball did not play in the NHL for the Penguins, and was traded to the Buffalo Sabres in 1971. Ball was a European scout for the Edmonton Oilers during the 1970s.

Ball was chosen by the World Hockey Association's Minnesota Fighting Saints in the 1972 general draft, and he signed with them. Ball played three seasons with Minnesota before being claimed by the Cleveland Crusaders in 1975. Ball played one season with Cleveland before being traded to the Cincinnati Stingers. Ball was picked up by the Birmingham Bulls in 1976, and he split the season between the Bulls and the minors.

In 1977, Ball signed with HIFK Helsinki, where he played two further seasons of hockey before ending his career.

Ball was inducted into the Manitoba Sports Hall of Fame in 2012.

Career statistics

Regular season and playoffs

Awards and achievements
 MJHL All-Star Team (1964)
 Manitoba Hockey Hall of Fame (2011)

References

External links
 

1944 births
Living people
Amarillo Wranglers players
Birmingham Bulls players
Brandon Wheat Kings players
Buffalo Sabres players
Canadian expatriate ice hockey players in Finland
Canadian ice hockey defencemen
Cincinnati Stingers players
Cincinnati Swords players
Cleveland Crusaders players
Edmonton Oilers scouts
HIFK (ice hockey) players
Ice hockey people from Manitoba
Kitchener Rangers players
Manitoba Sports Hall of Fame inductees
Minnesota Fighting Saints players
Minnesota Rangers players
Oklahoma City Blazers (1965–1977) players
Omaha Knights (CHL) players
Philadelphia Flyers players
Quebec Aces (AHL) players
Salt Lake Golden Eagles (WHL) players
Sportspeople from Selkirk, Manitoba
St. Paul Rangers players
Vancouver Canucks (WHL) players
Winnipeg Rangers players